Petar Vasilev may refer to:

 Petar B. Vasilev (1918–2001), Bulgarian film director
 Petar Vasilev (footballer) (born 1983), Bulgarian footballer